A list of American films released in 1995.
Braveheart won the Academy Award for Best Picture.

Highest-grossing

A

B–C

D–G

H–J

K–M

N–Q

R–S

T–Z

See also
 1995 in American television
 1995 in the United States

External links

 
 List of 1995 box office number-one films in the United States

Films
American
Lists of American films by year